Elephant Hill Provincial Park is a provincial park in British Columbia, Canada, protecting Elephant Hill, a prominent landmark adjacent to the Trans-Canada Highway at the cut-off for the town of Ashcroft, a few miles south of the town of Cache Creek. The park is approximately 968 hectares in area.

References
BANISH listing "Elephant Hill Park"
BC Parks webpage "Elephant Hill Provincial Park"

Provincial parks of British Columbia
Thompson Country
Year of establishment missing